Riverside Studios is an arts centre on the banks of the River Thames in Hammersmith, London, England. The venue plays host to contemporary performance, film, visual art exhibitions and television production.

Having closed for redevelopment in September 2014, Riverside Studios reopened in August 2019 with one of the first television broadcasts from Studio 1 being Channel 4's UK election coverage.

Film studio
In 1933, a former Victorian iron foundry on Crisp Road, London, was bought by Triumph Films and converted into a relatively compact film studio with two stages and a dubbing theatre. In 1935 the studios were taken over by Julius Hagen (then owner of Twickenham Studios) with the idea of using Riverside as an overflow for making quota quickies. However, by 1937 his company had gone into liquidation. Between 1937 and 1946, the studios were owned by Jack Buchanan and produced such films as We'll Meet Again (1943) with Vera Lynn and The Seventh Veil (1945) with James Mason. In 1946 the studios were acquired by Alliance Film Studios (then owners of Twickenham Studios and Southall Studios) and produced films including They Made Me a Fugitive (1948) with Trevor Howard, The Happiest Days of Your Life (1950) with Alistair Sim and Margaret Rutherford and Father Brown (1954) with Alec Guinness.

BBC Studios
In 1954, the studio was acquired by the British Broadcasting Corporation for its television service. Renamed The BBC Riverside Television Studios, the building was officially opened on 29 March 1957 by Queen Elizabeth The Queen Mother. Series 2 to 6 of Hancock's Half Hour (1957–60) were made there, along with other comedy, drama and music programmes, including the science-fiction serial Quatermass and the Pit (1958–59), Dixon of Dock Green, Six-Five Special, Z-Cars, Top of the Pops, the children's programmes Blue Peter and Play School. Episodes of Doctor Who were made at Riverside between 1964 and 1968, and Studio 1 was where First Doctor William Hartnell's regeneration scene was filmed. The facility remained in regular use until the BBC left in 1974.

Riverside Studios / Riverside Trust

The mission of Riverside Studios is to present a high quality arts programme and to make it accessible to all.

In 1974, a charitable trust formed by Hammersmith and Fulham Council took control of the building, and two large multi-purpose spaces designed by Michael Reardon were created from the studio's two main sound stages. While preparing Riverside's opening festival in 1976, the venue's first Artistic Director Peter Gill permitted an amateur West London music group called The Strand to use one of the performances spaces to rehearse.  They went on to become The Sex Pistols. Riverside's original policy was to have a combination of in house and visiting company productions of classical and contemporary plays and dance. Running concurrently with the main programme were regular events and activities including a film, music, education, workshop and play reading programme. David Gothard, the founding programming director, brought "The Dead Class" by Tadeusz Kantor and the Cricot 2 company from Krakow in Poland in 1977. Gothard was pivotal in Riverside Studios next steps.

Riverside Studios became fully operational in 1978 with Gill's landmark production of The Cherry Orchard, for which Julie Covington turned down the lead in Evita. The venue quickly acquired an international reputation for excellence and innovation with productions including The Changeling with Brian Cox and Robert Lindsay (1978), Measure for Measure with Helen Mirren (1979) and Julius Caesar with Phil Daniels (1980), as well as a variety of international work – including, notably, that of Polish theatre maestro Tadeusz Kantor. In 1978, Riverside hosted the first of many Dance Umbrella seasons, featuring the work of Rosemary Butcher and Richard Alston. Gill also offered residencies to artists including Bruce McLean and Ian Coughlin and companies such as the Black Theatre Co-operative (now NitroBeat).

Art exhibitions (including 'Prints' by Howard Hodgkin, 1978) had been curated by Milena Kalinovska in Riverside's foyer, but following Gill's departure in 1980, a purpose-built gallery space was established by the resident Architect Will Alsop and John Lyall along with Technical Director Steven Scott. The directorship of Jenny Stein established the first exhibition and showed works by the painter and graphic artist Edvard Munch. Subsequent exhibitions included David Hockney (Paintings and Drawings for Parade, 1981), Antony Gormley (New Sculpture, 1984), Louise Bourgeois (Recent Work, 1990) and Yoko Ono (In Facing, 1990)

From 1980, David Gothard directed the performing arts program and invited Michael Clark to become Riverside's first resident choreographer and made 16 original pieces at the studios before establishing his own dance company in 1984. Also in 1980, Samuel Beckett directed the San Quentin Theatre Workshop's rehearsals of his play Endgame in Studio 2, returning to Riverside four years later to direct the same company in Waiting for Godot. Under David Gothards direction the international theatre and dance program thrived with performance by Dario Fo and Franca Rame, Le Cirque Imaginaire, Eckehard Scall and the Berliner Ensemble, The Market Theater of Johannesburg, Cricot 2 of Krakow, Collectivo De Parma, and dance independent dance collaborations with Merce Cunningham and John Cage and members of the Judson Church. At the same time the legendary American tap dancers appeared in a sellout production of No Maps on My Taps featuring Chuck Green. During this period Riverside Studios was an artistic powerhouse that laid the foundations for its future. British artists flocked to the foyer and joined in collaborations with David Gothard from across all the arts disciplines including Peter Greenaway, Michael Nyman, Hanif Kureshi, Rebecca O'Brien, Jane Bernstein, David Leveaux, and a network of the worlds leading arts festivals and producing theaters including Edinburgh Festival, Spoleto Festival, Avignon Festival and Berlins Hebbel Theater.

In November 1987, a 200-seat cinema was opened by the actress Vanessa Redgrave.

In 1990, jazz veteran Adelaide Hall starred in the movie Sophisticated Lady, a documentary about her life, which included a performance of her in concert recorded live at the Riverside Studios.

William Burdett-Coutts (also Artistic Director of Assembly) was appointed Artistic Director of Riverside Studios in 1993. While Riverside continued its multi-arts programming (hosting companies such as Complicite, The Wooster Group and Howard Barker's The Wrestling School), its 200-seat cinema was celebrated for its double bill programmes and the variety of international film festivals which took place annually. In 1996, television production returned to Riverside when TFI Friday with Chris Evans took up residence in Studio 1 (until 2000). CD:UK was broadcast from Riverside between 2003 and 2006, while later TV projects included Channel 4's T4 (2006–2009), Popworld and The Last Leg, BBC's Never Mind the Buzzcocks and ITV's Celebrity Juice (2008–2014).

In September 2014, Riverside closed for redevelopment.

Redevelopment
London developer Mount Anvil, working in conjunction with A2 Dominion, redeveloped the old Riverside Studios and the adjacent Queen's Wharf building. Assael Architecture, were employed to design a new building on the site centred around 165 residential flats, with new studio facilities for theatre and television, two cinemas, a riverside restaurant and café/bar as well as flexible event spaces. As part of the redevelopment, a new riverside walkway connects to the Thames Path alongside the late Victorian Hammersmith Bridge.

During the redevelopment, Riverside continued to produce shows including Nirbhaya by Yael Farber at a number of international venues including Southbank Centre and Lynn Redgrave Theatre (2015), Raz, a new play by Jim Cartwright at Trafalgar Studios (2016) and A Christmas Carol with Simon Callow at the Arts Theatre (2016–17).  Riverside's digital production team also recorded a number of theatre and dance productions for broadcast including Land of Our Fathers by Chris Urch, Northern Ballet's adaptation of Nineteen Eighty-Four and Out of Joint's production of The Winters Tale.

A blue plaque produced by the Hammersmith and Fulham Historic Buildings Group to commemorate Riverside's history was installed at the venue's main entrance in March 2018.

Riverside Studios reopened to the public in late 2019.

Studios
 Studio 1 -  HD and UHD studio with audience seating for 368 (capacity of 468), Operated by Riverside TV with links to BT Tower
 Studio 2 -  multi-use black-box studio with audience capacity of 400
 Studio 3 -  primarily theatre studio with audience capacity of 180
 Studio 4 - flexible events space with river views with capacity of 100
 Studio 5 - rehearsal/community space with capacity of 60

Selected television productions

1000 Heartbeats
Alan Davies: As Yet Untitled (series one)
CD:UK
Celebrity Juice
Ceefax
EFL on Quest 
Have I Got News for You
Never Mind the Buzzcocks
Peter Crouch: Save Our Summer
Popworld
Revenge of the Egghead
Robert's Web
Russell Howard's Good News
Sweat the Small Stuff
T4
TFI Friday
That Sunday Night Show
The Apprentice: You're Fired!
The Elaine Paige Show
The Last Leg
Top of the Pops
Unzipped
You Have Been Watching
Weekend Kitchen with Waitrose

Selected theatre productions 
 The Ragged Trousered Philanthropists by Joint Stock. Directed by William Gaskill (1978)
 St. Mark's Gospel devised, directed and performed by Alec McCowen (1978)
 Mama Dragon by Black Theatre Co-operative (1980) 
 The Biko Inquest with Albert Finney, Nigel Davenport and Michael Gough (1984)
 Playing the Right Tune by Benjamin Zephaniah (1985)
 Twelfth Night with Richard Briers and Frances Barber. Directed by Kenneth Branagh (1988)
 The Pornography of Performance by The Sydney Front (1989)
 Hamlet with Alan Rickman and Geraldine McEwan (1992)
 The Seven Streams of the River Ota by Robert Lepage (1994)
 Antony and Cleopatra with Vanessa Redgrave (1994)
 Mnemonic by Complicite (2003)
 Phèdre with Sheila Gish. Directed by Deborah Warner (2002)
 Scaramouche Jones with Pete Postlethwaite (2002)
 The Exonerated with Stockard Channing, Aidan Quinn, Danny Glover and Alanis Morissette. Directed by Bob Balaban (2006)
 Spectacular by Forced Entertainment (2008)
 1800 Acres by David Myers with Cathy Tyson (2008)
 The New Electric Ballroom by Enda Walsh (2009) 
 Windmill Baby (winner of the Patrick White Playwrights' Award) by David Milroy and Ningali Lawford (2009)
 Salad Days by Tête à Tête (2010/11 and 2012/13)
 Troilus and Cressida by The Wooster Group and The Royal Shakespeare Company (2010)
 A Round-Heeled Woman: the play with Sharon Gless (2011)
 Mies Julie adapted from August Strindberg's Miss Julie by Yaël Farber (2013)
 Happy Days by Samuel Beckett, Directed by Trevor Nunn (June - July, 2021)
 Ava: The Secret Conversations written by and starring Elizabeth McGovern based on the book by Peter Evans and Ava Gardner (Jan - April, 2022)
 Great Expectations by Charles Dickens performed by Eddie Izzard (Feb, 2022)
 Operation Mincemeat presented by SpitLip (May - July, 2022)

Selected dance productions 
 Dance Umbrella (first London Dance Umbrella festival staged at Riverside and the Institute of Contemporary Arts in 1978)
 Empty Signals by Rosemary Butcher (1978)
 Rush by Michael Clark (1982)
 Set & Reset by Trisha Brown (1983)
 Of Shadows and Walls by Rosemary Butcher (1991)
 Twyla Tharp (1994)
 Stormforce by Rophin Vianney (2006)
 Episodes of Light by Rosemary Butcher (2008)
 Mamootot by Batsheva Dance Company (2008)
 Havana Rumba by Toby Gough (2009)
 Circa (contemporary circus) (2009)
 Dancing on Your Grave by Lea Anderson's The Cholmondeleys and The Featherstonehaughs (2009)
 At Swim Two Boys by Earthfall Dance (2012)
 Chelsea Hotel by Earthfall Dance (2013)

Selected live comedy shows 
 Lenny Henry (1988)
 Peter Sellers Is Dead (with Sanjeev Bhaskar, Nina Wadia, Kulvinder Ghir and Meera Syal. A precursor to the BBC radio and TV series' Goodness Gracious Me (BBC) (1995)
 Stand Up South Africa with Mel Miller (comedian) (2002)
 Ed Byrne: Me Again (2004) and Different Class (2008)
 Bill Bailey: Tinselworm (2007)
 Pappy's: Funergy (2009)
 Richard Herring: The Twelve Tasks of Hercules Terrace (2009)
 Julian Clary (2010)
 Carl Barron (2011)
 Rhod Gilbert
 Wil Anderson
 Count Arthur Strong: The Man Behind the Smile

Selected music performances 
Toyah (1979)
New Order (4 January 1982)
Sigue Sigue Sputnik (24 July 1985)
Van Morrison and The Chieftains (1988)
Prince (1999)
David Bowie (2003)
Annie Lennox (2003)
Pink (2003)
Metallica (2003)
Amy Winehouse (2008)
Stereophonics (2008)
Kelis (2010)
Lionel Richie
Oasis
Tom Robinson hosted live recording sessions for his BBC Radio 6 Music radio show, show Introducing... in Studio 3.

Photos

References

Sopurces

Who's Who in the Theatre 17th edition, Gale Publishing (1982) 

Staging Beckett in Great Britain, Bloomsbury Methuen Drama (2016)

External links 

 – official site
Riverside TV Studios Ltd
The Riverside Story
Riverside Studios history

Television studios in London
Arts centres in London
British film studios
Cinemas in London
Dance in London
Music venues in London
Theatres in the London Borough of Hammersmith and Fulham